Ramonda serbica, also known as Serbian ramonda and Serbian phoenix flower, is a species in the family Gesneriaceae. It is one of the few European representatives of this family, found in Albania, Bulgaria, Greece, North Macedonia and Serbia. The flower was discovered by Serbian botanist Josif Pančić in 1874 near Niš. It is known for its ability to be revived when watered, even when fully dehydrated, also known as a Desiccation plant. In Serbia it is used as a symbol of Armistice Day in World War I.

References

Bibliography 
 Mike F. Quartacci, Olivera Glisic, Branka Stevanovic, and Flavia Navari-Izzo.  Plasma membrane lipids in the resurrection plant Ramonda serbica following dehydration and rehydration. J. Exp. Bot 2001.53:2159-2166.
 Rix, E.M. & Webb, D.A. 1972. Ramonda L.C.M. Richard. - In: Tutin, T.G., Heywood, V.H., Burges, N.A., Moore, D.M., Valentine, D.H., Walters, S.M. & Webb, D.A. Flora Europaea vol. 3. Pp. Cambridge University Press, Cambridge.
 Markova, M. 1995. Ramonda. - In: Kozhuharov, S. Flora of People's Republic of Bulgaria. Vol. 10. pp. 288–289. Bulgarian Academy of Sciences Publishing House, Sofia. (In Bulgarian)
 Petrova, A. & Vladimirov, V. 2010. Balkan endemics in the Bulgarian flora. - Phytologia Balcanica 16(2): 293–311.

Flora of Europe
Didymocarpoideae
Plants described in 1874